George Peters may refer to:

 George Peters (aviator) (1894–?), Australian flying ace in World War I
 George Peters (footballer) (1912–1988), Australian footballer
 George Peters (banker), Governor of the Bank of England, 1785–1787
 George Peters, American football, an 8th round pick by the Washington Redskins in the 1942 NFL Draft
 George Peters, German-born American artist, created murals and mascot for Milwaukee sausage maker Usinger's in 1906
 George Fountain Peters, builder in 1899 of Glen Store and Post Office, Potomac, Maryland
 George G. Peters of Boston, commissioned and in 1907 owned the ship later renamed USS Wanderlust
 George Henry Peters (1863–1947), American astronomer
 George J. Peters (1924–1945), American soldier and Medal of Honor recipient
 George N. H. Peters (1825–1909), American religion writer
 George Silas Peters (1846–1928), mayor of Columbus, Ohio, 1881–1882
 George W. Peters, president and dean of Fresno Pacific University, 1947–1960

Characters
 George Peters (EastEnders), soap opera character
 George Peters, in the 1934 film Mandalay, played by Lucien Littlefield
 George Peters, in the 1955 film A Word to the Wives..., played by Darren McGavin
 George Peters, in the 1959 television series Manhunt, fictional detective played by Charles Bateman
 George Peters, a character in The $5,000,000 Counterfeiting Plot
George Peters, an assumed identity used by Huck Finn in Mark Twain's novel “Huck Finn”

Places
 George Peters House, on the National Register of Historic Places listings in Outagamie County, Wisconsin
 George W. Peters House, on the National Register of Historic Places listings in Knoxville, Tennessee
 George Peters Family Cemetery, in Hensley Township, Champaign County, Illinois

See also
 George Rea (George Peters Rea, 1894–?), president of the American Stock Exchange
 George Peter (disambiguation)